The rufous cisticola (Cisticola rufus) is a species of bird in the family Cisticolidae.
It is found in Burkina Faso, Cameroon, Central African Republic, Chad, Gambia, Ghana, Guinea, Mali, Nigeria, Senegal, Sierra Leone, and Togo.
Its natural habitats are subtropical or tropical dry shrubland and subtropical or tropical dry lowland grassland.

References

rufous cisticola
Birds of West Africa
rufous cisticola
rufous cisticola
Taxonomy articles created by Polbot